Yuyuan can refer to:

Yuyuan Garden (豫园), a Chinese garden in Shanghai.
Yuyuan Tourist Mart, a shopping center outside Yuyuan Garden.
Jiang Yuyuan (江钰源), a Chinese gymnast.
Yuyuan, the postal romanization of the name of Ruyuan Yao Autonomous County, Guangdong Province, China